Big Dreams Little Tokyo is a 2006 feature-length motion picture written and directed by Dave Boyle. The film premiered November 2, 2006 at the AFI Festival in Hollywood, California and is released on DVD through Echo Bridge on July 22, 2008.

Plot 
Boyd is an American with an uncanny ability to speak Japanese. He aspires to succeed in the world of Japanese business but finds himself mostly on the outside looking in. Meanwhile, his roommate Jerome is a Japanese American who has always felt too American to be Japanese but too Japanese to be American. He aspires to be a sumo wrestler but finds his weight and blood pressure are thwarting his dreams. Together they struggle to find their place in a world where cultural identity is seldom what it seems.

Cast

Production 
The film was the feature debut of Boyle who conceived the idea while living in the Japantown area of Sydney, Australia. Many of the characters in the film were based on people he met and interacted with while there. It was shot in the summer of 2005 in San Jose and San Francisco, California as well as Salt Lake City, Utah. Big Dreams Little Tokyo was produced by Duane Andersen and Megan Boyle.

References 
 Review from LA Splash
 Interview with director David Boyle
 Inclusion of Big Dreams Little Tokyo in AFI 20/20 program
 AFI reports on BDLT opening night
 Interview from LA Japanese newspaper Rafu Shimpo

External links 
Official site

 

2006 films
2006 comedy films
Films set in Australia
Films shot in San Francisco
American comedy films
2000s English-language films
2000s American films